Tiruvaikuntam is a panchayat town in Thoothukudi district in the Indian state of Tamil Nadu. It is located on the banks of the river Thamirabarani.

Tiruvaikuntam has a temple dedicated to Vishnu, known as Tiruvaikuntapathi Swami, with a lofty gopuram. The Thiruvengada Mudaiyar Mandapam is rich with sculptures of Yallis, elephants and warriors. The Ekadasi Mandapam, which is opened on Vaikunta Ekadasi days, contains sculptures. During the period of conflict between the East India Company forces and Veera Pandiya Kattabomman, the temple served as a fort. The Kailasanathaswamy temple is another important temple and contains six inscriptions of the times of Kattabomman.

Geography
It has an average elevation of 17 metres (55 feet). The town is located on the north bank of the Tamirabarani river. It is 30 km east of Tirunelveli , 30 km west of Tiruchendur and 39 km from Tuticorin.

Demographics
 India census, Tiruvaikuntam had a population of 16,214. Males constituted 48% of the population and females 52%. Tiruvaikuntam had an average literacy rate of 77%, higher than the national average of 59.5%: male literacy was 81%, and female literacy was 72%. In Tiruvaikuntam, 11% of the population was under 6 years of age. Tiruvaikuntam has a considerable population of Appanad Maravars and Brahmins in that region

Landmarks

Tiruvaikuntanathan Perumal Temple
Kailasanathar Temple, Tiruvaikuntam (Sivan temple, one of the Navakailayam temples)

Festivals
Fifth day festival every year April mid (சித்திரை மாதம் Tamil month Sithirai)
Ninth day Car festival every year April mid (சித்திரை மாதம் Tamil month Sithirai)
Vaikunta Ekadashi (Tamil: வைகுண்ட ஏகாதசி) Dec/Jan 
Kuruz Kovil (RC Church) Festival from 16 July to 25 July

Transport
Bus services are conducted from Madurai, Tirunelveli, Tiruchendur and Thoothukudi through Tiruvaikuntam. There is a railway station at Tiruvaikuntam. Nearest air services are 24.6 km away at Thoothukudi.

Education
Arulmighu Kumara Gurupara Swamigal Arts College, Tiruvaikuntam
Arulmighu Kumara Gurupara Swamigal Public Library, Tiruvaikuntam
Sri Kumara Gurupara Swamikal Hr Sec School, Tiruvaikuntam
Arulmigu Kumara Gurupara Swamikal Government Girls Hr. Sec. School, Tiruvaikuntam
TV RamaSubbier Krishnammal Hindu Vidyalaya Matriculation Higher Secondary School, Tiruvaikuntam
Hajji Miyan Abdul Cader Middle School, Tiruvaikuntam
SDA Mat Hr Sec School, Tiruvaikuntam
Sri Kumara Gurupara swamigal primary school, Tiruvaikuntam
St James Matriculation School, Tiruvaikuntam
ulagammalanni Niyabahartha Middle School, Tiruvaikuntam

See also 
 Authoor
 Maranthalai
 Pudukkudi West
 Umarikadu
 Vazhavallan
 Vittilapuram

References

Cities and towns in Thoothukudi district